Michael W. Rice (born December 9, 1943), son of Francis Xavier Rice and Arlene (Utz) Rice of Hanover, Pennsylvania, is a 3rd generation American businessman serving as Director, Chairman Emeritus, and Special Advisor to Utz of Utz Quality Foods, Inc.  Mr. Rice previously held the role of Executive Chairman which he assumed in December 2012 following his role as chairman of the board and chief executive officer of Utz from 1992 until 2012. Mr. Rice served as president and chief executive officer of Utz from 1978 until 1992. Prior to serving as chief executive officer, Mr. Rice served as Executive Vice President of Utz from 1970 to 1978. Mr. Rice also serves as a Member of the Board of Managers of the Utz Members. Mr. Rice is the father-in-law of Dylan Lissette, who serves as chief executive officer of Utz and is a member of the Board of Directors of the company. The Company believes that Mr. Rice's extensive institutional knowledge of Utz and experience serving as chief executive officer and Executive Chairman of Utz qualifies him to serve as a director of the company. Rice is an alumnus of Mount St. Mary's University class of 1965, and he holds a law degree from George Washington University School of Law. During his tenure as CEO of Utz, he has led the expansion of the company to most of the Eastern United States with revenues exceeding $500 million per year in 2009.

Rice's current house in Avalon, New Jersey covering  was initially rejected by state and municipal authorities; it was ultimately agreed to limit the house to 40 rooms.

Notes

Living people
1943 births
People from Hanover, Pennsylvania
American chief executives of food industry companies
Mount St. Mary's University alumni
George Washington University Law School alumni
People from Avalon, New Jersey